Tout de suite maintenant is a 2016 Franco-Luxembourgish drama film directed and co-written by Pascal Bonitzer. It stars Agathe Bonitzer, Vincent Lacoste, Lambert Wilson, Isabelle Huppert, Jean-Pierre Bacri and Pascal Greggory.

Plot 
A young woman who has just joined a finance company learns that her boss and his wife were once acquainted with her father in their youth, and that animosity exists between them, for unknown reasons. A go-getter, she eventually rises through the corporate ranks, but develops a complicated relationship with a colleague who happens to be dating her sister.

Cast 
 Agathe Bonitzer as Nora
 Vincent Lacoste as Xavier
 Lambert Wilson as Barsac
 Isabelle Huppert as Solveig 
 Jean-Pierre Bacri as Serge
 Pascal Greggory as Prévôt-Parédès
 Julia Faure as Maya
 Virgil Vernier as Zeligmann
 Yannick Renier as Van Stratten
 François Baldassare as Raoul
 Laure Roldan as Fleur

References

External links 
 

2016 films
2016 drama films
2010s French-language films
French drama films
Luxembourgian drama films
Films directed by Pascal Bonitzer
2010s French films